Narcetes kamoharai is a species of fish in the family Alepocephalidae (slickheads). The fish is found in the Western Pacific with Japan and the Philippines in its range.

Etymology
The fish is named in honor of Toshiji Kamohara (1901–1972), an ichthyologist at Kochi University.

References

Masuda, H., K. Amaoka, C. Araga, T. Uyeno and T. Yoshino, 1984. The fishes of the Japanese Archipelago. Vol. 1. Tokai University Press, Tokyo, Japan. 437 p.  

Alepocephalidae
Fish of Japan
Taxa named by Osamu Okamura 
Fish described in 1984